Creek Street is a major street in the central business district of Brisbane, Queensland, Australia. The street follows a one-way south–north direction, starting at the beginning of Charlotte Street and cutting through Elizabeth Street, Queen Street, Adelaide Street, and Ann Street before coming to an end at Turbot Street in the northern end of the CBD. Creek Street was named for the filled-in creek over which it was constructed, and is an exception to the convention of parallel streets in the CBD being named after male royals.

History

In 2008 it was announced that the Brisbane City Council was going to convert the street into a two-way road to improve traffic flow in the CBD as part of its Town Reach project. Doubts emerged later in the year due to cost blowouts and traffic planners who questioned the new design's effectiveness. After traffic tests proved the new design was not feasible, the plan was put on hold indefinitely.

Heritage listings 
Creek Street has a number of heritage-listed sites, including:
 131 Creek Street: St Andrews Uniting Church
308 Queen Street (corner of Creek Street): National Australia Bank
Eagle Street (corner of Creek Street): Eagle Street Fig Trees

Financial district
The street is part of the emerging financial district known as the "Golden Triangle". The street is lined with a wall of skyscrapers of 100m or more in height including:

 Comalco Place
 Central Plaza 1
 NAB House

Major intersections

 Charlotte Street
 Eagle Street
 Elizabeth Street
 Queen Street
 Adelaide Street
 Ann Street
 Turbot Street
 Wickham Terrace

See also

 Alice Street
 Margaret Street

References

External links

 
Streets in Brisbane
Brisbane central business district